The Treaty of Windsor is the diplomatic alliance signed between Portugal and England on 9 May 1386 at Windsor and sealed by the marriage of King John I of Portugal (House of Aviz) to Philippa of Lancaster, daughter of John of Gaunt, 1st Duke of Lancaster. With the victory at the Battle of Aljubarrota, assisted by English archers, John I was recognised as the undisputed King of Portugal, putting an end to the interregnum of the 1383–1385 Crisis. The Treaty of Windsor established a pact of mutual support between the countries.

This document is preserved at the Portuguese National Archives.

Historian Matthew Winslett says, "This treaty has been the cornerstone of both nations' relations with each other ever since."

See also
Anglo-Portuguese Treaty of 1373
British Ultimatum of 1890
Timeline of Portuguese history
Anglo-Portuguese Alliance
Treaty of Tagilde

References

Bibliography
Country profile of Portugal,  Foreign, Commonwealth and Development Office website
 
 

History of Berkshire
Windsor 1386
Windsor 1386
Windsor, Berkshire
14th century in Portugal
1386 in England
Windsor
England–Portugal relations